A project network diagram is a graph that displays the order in which a project’s activities are to be completed. Derived from the work breakdown structure, the terminal elements of a project are organized sequentially based on the relationship among them. It is typically drawn from left to right to reflect project chronology.

Techniques

Activity-on-Node 
The Activity-on-Node (AON) technique uses nodes to represent individual project activities and path arrows to designate the sequence of activity completion. Nodes are labelled using information pertaining to the activity. According to Project Management, nodes should at least display the following information:

 Identifier
 Descriptive label
 Activity duration
 Early start time
 Early finish time
 Late start time
 Late finish time
 Activity float (slack)

Start and finish times are used to determine the critical path of a project. Activity float, or slack, time is used in project crashing.

Other techniques 
The condition for a valid project network is that it doesn't contain any circular references.

Project dependencies can also be depicted by a predecessor table. Although such a form is very inconvenient for human analysis, project management software often offers such a view for data entry.

An alternative way of showing and analyzing the sequence of project work is the design structure matrix or dependency structure matrix.

See also 

 Bar chart
 Float (project management)
 Gantt chart
 Project management 
 Project planning 
 Program evaluation and review technique

References

External links 
 Critical Path Mapping with Activity Network Diagrams
 Understand how scheduling tools works-Draw network diagram yourself

Charts
Project management techniques
Schedule (project management)